The 1979 Royal Bank of Scotland World Women's Curling Championship also known as the Women's World Invitational Curling Championship or The Royal Bank Ladies World Curling Championship was the first ever women's world championship. It was held at the Perth Ice Rink in Perth, Scotland from 17 March to 23 March 1979.

Canada and the USA joined the nine teams that played in the 1978 European Curling Championships. The Championship was won by Switzerland, who beat Sweden 13-5 in the final.

The event was billed as the women's world championship, but was not sanctioned by the International Curling Federation at the time.

Teams

Round-robin standings

Results

Draw 1

Draw 2

Draw 3

Draw 4

Draw 5

Draw 6

Draw 7

Draw 8

Draw 9

Draw 10

Draw 11

Tiebreakers

Playoffs

Semifinals

Final

References 

Women's curling competitions in Scotland
World Women's Curling Championship
Royal Bank Of Scotland World Women's Curling Championship, 1979
Sport in Perth, Scotland
Royal Bank Of Scotland World Women's Curling Championship, 1979
World Women's Curling Championship
1979 in Scottish women's sport
International curling competitions hosted by Scotland